Ten9Eight: Shoot for the Moon is a 2009 documentary film about inner New York City teenagers who compete in an annual business plan competition run by the Network for Teaching Entrepreneurship (NFTE) written, directed, and produced by Mary Mazzio.

Synopsis
Mary Mazzio's Ten9Eight: Shoot for the Moon, is about teenagers competing in a nationwide business contest. It follows the stories of several inner city teens (of differing race, religion, and ethnicity) as they compete in the annual business plan competition run by the Network for Teaching Entrepreneurship (NFTE). The teens come from all over the country and are among the 24,000 students that compete in the event each year, with the winner taking home a $10,000 grand prize.

It played in movie theaters owned by its sponsor, AMC Entertainment, in seven US cities.

Critical reception
Critical reception was unenthusiastic.

References

External links
 Official movie website
 
 

2009 films
2009 documentary films
American documentary films
Documentary films about education in the United States
Documentary films about business
Documentary films about adolescence
2000s English-language films
2000s American films